The Olympus OM-D E-M1 Micro Four Thirds is Olympus' compact mirrorless interchangeable-lens camera introduced on September 10, 2013. It has built-in on sensor phase detection.

As of October 2014, it had the highest camera sensor rating of any Olympus camera, according to DxO Labs, with a score of 73.

Features include 
 Sensor: 16 MP Live MOS sensor and no anti-aliasing filter
 Buffer for 40 raw images at 10 frames per second with focus locked or 45 raw images at 6 frame per second with continuous autofocus.
 Image stabilization: Olympus 5-axis image stabilization 
 TruePic VII processor with lens correction
 ISO range: 200–25600, with "LOW ISO 100"
 Manual focus with focus peaking
 Focus points
81 in contrast detection autofocus mode
37 in phase detection autofocus mode
 In-camera HDR
 Flash: no built-in flash, small external flash included
 Flash sync: 1/320 s
 HD video capture, including 1080i at 30 fps and 720p at 60 fps 
 Built-in Wi-Fi: 802.11 b/g/n for remote shooting via smartphone or tablet
 Weather sealing: dust, splash, freeze resistance (-10˚C)
 Customizable buttons: 2 on the front
 Built-in microphone socket
 Ports: AP2 accessory port, AV/USB, HDMI connector

Olympus OM-D E-M1 Mark II 

In 2016, the OM-D E-M1 was superseded by the Olympus OM-D E-M1 Mark II. The Mark II features a slightly higher resolution 20 MP Live MOS sensor. The Mark II also has substantially faster auto focus—according to the manufacturer, six times faster upon first focus acquisition than the original E-M1. The camera also has a 60 fps max shooting rate in Pro Capture mode using the electronic shutter, and vibration reduction technology in lenses as well as in camera.

Olympus OM-D E-M1X

Olympus OM-D E-M1 Mark III

OM System OM-1

References

Further reading 
 David Thorpe: The Olympus E-M1 MkII Menu System Simplified, 5 April 2017, 
 Tony Phillips: The Complete Guide to the Olympus O-MD E-M1 II, 15 September 2017,

External links 

 Official Website
 Olympus E-M1 Instruction Manual (English)
 Olympus Compatibility Tables page

OM-D E-M1
Cameras introduced in 2013